is a railway station in the city of Ōgaki, Gifu Prefecture Japan, operated by the private railway operator Yōrō Railway.

Lines

Station layout
Mino-Yanagi Station has one side platform serving a single bi-directional track. The station is unattended.

Adjacent stations

|-
!colspan=5|Yōrō Railway

History
Mino-Yanagi Station opened on June 1, 1934.

Passenger statistics
In fiscal 2015, the station was used by an average of 491 passengers daily (boarding passengers only).

Surrounding area
  Ogaki Industrial High School

See also
 List of Railway Stations in Japan

References

External links

 

Railway stations in Gifu Prefecture
Railway stations in Japan opened in 1934
Stations of Yōrō Railway
Ōgaki